The Little Artists are John Cake and Darren Neave. They create versions of well known contemporary artworks and art personalities in miniature using toy Lego bricks. They also produce a range of merchandise. They describe themselves as conceptual artists. Their work is collected by Charles Saatchi.

Career and art
They studied Fine Art at Leeds University. They have been collecting Lego for over 20 years, and started from when they were children. They buy all the new sets that are produced and also buy off the internet. A figure of Salvador Dalí, for example, was made by combining the Harry Potter set with the standard "woman's hair" and a conquistador's face from an old pirate set. They started seriously making the Lego pieces in 2003, but their first attempt was earlier:

Their first show in a public gallery was Art Craziest Nation (named after Matthew Collings' book, Art Crazy Nation) at the Walker Art Gallery in Liverpool from August 2005 for five months. The artists created an art show in miniature. Titles of the works shown (all made from Lego) included Hirst's Shark Tank, Warhol's Money, Andre's Bricks, Craig-Martin's Tree, Beuys' Sleighs, Emin's Bed and Chapmans' Dead Guys. Some pieces are now on display as part of the Gallery's permanent collection.

Their work includes "Lick Your Selves", edible frozen versions of Marc Quinn's Self sculpture.  This was on show in Brighton in 2006 and Sheffield Blocspace 2005.

 
In November 2005 they staged a show called Contemporary Artists Play Pictionary at the Agency Contemporary Gallery in London. They described this as "part-installation, part-performance, part-curatorial". Over 50 artists took part in a round of Pictionary, a game where a word has to be communicated in a drawing. The drawings were signed and then auctioned to benefit the National Autistic Society. Participating artists included Tracey Emin, Billy Childish, Gavin Turk, Mark Wallinger, Charles Thomson, Georgina Starr and Mark Quinn.

They are currently using Smurfs, Martin Kippenberger and Batman as reference points in new work.

The Little Artists work from a studio in London. Their studio is known as "The Red Studio" after the painting by Matisse.

See also
Damien Hirst
An Oak Tree

References

External links
Little Artists official site
John Cake site
Drawings in Contemporary Artists Play Pictionary
Art Craziest Nation at the Walker Art Gallery
Interview with the Little Artists on BBC Online
The Little Artists on Flickr

British sculptors
21st-century sculptors
Living people
Year of birth missing (living people)